Chlamydastis leucoplasta is a moth of the family Depressariidae. It is found in Peru and Brazil.

The wingspan is about 13 mm. The forewings are dark fuscous with a broad white fusiform costal band, almost from the base to the apex. There are two or three indistinct whitish dots on the termen. The hindwings are grey, darker in females.

References

Moths described in 1926
Chlamydastis